Clear Heart Full Eyes is the debut solo album by The Hold Steady vocalist and guitarist Craig Finn, released on January 24, 2012 on Full Time Hobby. Produced by Mike McCarthy, the album was recorded during a five-month break from The Hold Steady, with Finn noting, "I wanted to do something with a little more storytelling and a lot less volume." Upon release, the album debuted at #89 in the US.

Rolling Stone named the song "Rented Room" the 40th best song of 2012.

Writing and composition
Regarding his character-based lyrics and use of specific locations in his work, Finn noted, "I think it’s a whole different world [than that of The Hold Steady], the songs seem like vignettes that are a little separate from each other. But at the same time, I can’t help... "The Wagon Wheel" comes up twice on the record, and that’s a fictitious bar I’m thinking of, and that happens in two different songs. So somehow, I still am attracted to creating these worlds, but I don’t see the characters on the solo record interacting as much."

Track listing
"Apollo Bay" 5:46
"When No One's Watching" 3:46
"No Future" 3:44
"New Friend Jesus" 3:10
"Jackson" 3:18
"Terrified Eyes" 4:47
"Western Pier" 3:52
"Honolulu Blues" 4:15
"Rented Room" 4:36
"Balcony" 3:13
"Not Much Left Of Us" 4:12

Personnel
Musicians
Craig Finn - vocals, guitar
Josh Block - drums, percussion
Jesse Ebaugh - bass guitar, upright bass, bass six, organ
Ricky Ray Jackson - guitars, pedal steel
Billy White - guitars, bass six
Catherine Davis - piano, organ, keyboards
Katie Holmes - fiddle
Hope Irish - backing vocals
Will Johnson - backing vocals

Recording
Mike McCarthy - producer
Jim Vollentine - additional engineering
Matthew Smith - assistant engineer
Greg Calbi - mastering

Artwork
Christian Helms - art direction, design
Erick Montes - art direction, design
Susan Helms - cover textile art
Andrew Yates - photography
Don Weir - photography

References

2012 debut albums
Craig Finn albums
Full Time Hobby albums